Malangen ( or ) is a former municipality in Troms county in Norway.  The  municipality existed from 1871 until its dissolution in 1964.  The old municipality surrounded the Malangen fjord and today that area is divided between the municipalities of Balsfjord, Lenvik, Tromsø, and Målselv.  The administrative centre was the village of Mortenhals where the main church for the municipality, Malangen Church, is located.

History
The Saga of Haakon Haakonarson mentions that in 1242 the king allowed refugees from Bjarmaland (since they were attacked by the Tatars - ) to settle in the area of Malangen.

The municipality of Malangen was established on 1 January 1871 when the northern district of Balsfjord Municipality and a small peninsula in the Malangen fjord that belonged to Lenvik Municipality were separated to form the new municipality of Malangen.  The initial population of Malangen was 1,425.  On 1 January 1873, an area of northern Malangen (population: 287) was transferred to the neighboring Tromsøysund municipality. In 1891, a small part around the village of Målsnes in Målselv Municipality (population: 30) was transferred to Malangen.

During the 1960s, there were many municipal mergers across Norway due to the work of the Schei Committee.  On 1 January 1964, the municipality of Malangen ceased to exist.  The peninsula including the Navaren and Målsnes areas (population: 118) were transferred to neighboring Målselv Municipality.  The remaining areas of Malangen (population: 1,940) were transferred back into Balsfjord Municipality.

Name
The municipality was named after the local Malangen fjord.  The name Malangen is probably derived from the Old Norse word mál which means "bag" and it may refer to the baggy shape of the fjord. The same word mál is probably also the origin of the name of the Målselva, the big river that enters the fjord from the Målselvdalen and Bardu valleys (the neighboring Målselv Municipality has a similar etymology).  The second element of the name angr which means "inlet" or "fjord".

Government

Municipal council
The municipal council  of Malangen was made up of 19 representatives that were elected to four year terms.  The party breakdown of the final municipal council was as follows:

Media gallery

See also
List of former municipalities of Norway

References

External links

Weather information for Malangen 

Balsfjord
Målselv
Former municipalities of Norway
1871 establishments in Norway
1964 disestablishments in Norway